Thomas Johansson was the defending champion but lost in the quarterfinals to Kenneth Carlsen.

Yevgeny Kafelnikov won in the final 2–6, 6–4, 6–4 against Nicolas Kiefer.

Seeds
A champion seed is indicated in bold text while text in italics indicates the round in which that seed was eliminated.

  Yevgeny Kafelnikov (champion)
  Roger Federer (semifinals)
  Thomas Johansson (quarterfinals)
  Pete Sampras (second round)
  Jiří Novák (first round)
  Younes El Aynaoui (first round)
  Carlos Moyá (first round)
  Fabrice Santoro (first round)

Draw

Finals

Top half

Bottom half

External links
 2002 Gerry Weber Open Draw
 

2002 Gerry Weber Open